Little Things is a studio album by American country artist Jeannie Seely. It was released in December 1968 on Monument Records and was co-produced by Fred Foster and Jim Malloy. The record was Seely's fourth studio album recorded and released. It spawned three singles in 1968. Two of these singles became hits on the Billboard country chart. The album would be Seely's final studio release while recording for Monument.

Background and content
Little Things was recorded in several sessions between August 1967 and August 1968. Some of the musical sessions were recorded at the Fred Foster Sound Studio while the remaining cuts were recorded at Bradley's Barn. Both venues were located in Nashville, Tennessee. Most of the album's sessions were produced by Fred Foster, Seely's longtime collaborator at Monument. However, four tracks were produced by Jim Malloy. The album contained 11 tracks. One of these tracks, "Maybe I Should Leave", was penned by Seely herself. Three of the tracks were written by Seely's then-husband and songwriter, Hank Cochran. The title track was composed by Willie Nelson and his wife Shirley Nelson. The album also included cover versions of songs previously recorded by other music artists. Among these tracks was "Harper Valley PTA", previously recorded by Jeannie C. Riley the same year. The seventh track, "Dreams of the Everyday Housewife", was first cut by Glen Campbell.

Release and reception

Little Things was released in December 1968 on Monument Records. It was originally issued as a vinyl record, with five songs of the first side and six songs on the opposite side of the record. In the 2010s, the project was released in a digital format. Little Things peaked at number 36 on the Billboard Top Country Albums chart in January 1969. It became Seely's fourth album to place on the list.

The project also included three singles released by Seely in 1968. The three singles issued from the album failed to become major hits, instead reaching top 40 positions on the Billboard country singles chart. The first single, "Welcome Home to Nothing", reached number 24 on the Billboard Hot Country Singles chart in April 1968. The next single issued, "How Is He", peaked at number 23 on the same chart. The third single spawned from the album was the title track, which did not chart on any Billboard publication. The album received reviews since its release. A 1968 review by Billboard gave the record a positive reception. "Jeannie Seely only needs the right tune to score hard; she has several tunes here in that category," writers commented. In later years, the album was reviewed by Allmusic and it received a rating of 2.5 out of 5 stars.

Track listing

Original edition

Digital edition

Personnel
All credits are adapted from the liner notes of Little Things.

 Hank Cochran – liner notes
 Fred Foster – producer
 Ken Kim – photography
 Jim Malloy – producer 
 Cam Mullins – arrangement
 Jeannie Seely – lead vocals
 Tommy Strong – engineering
 Charlie Tallent – engineering
 Mort Thomasson – engineering

Chart performance

Release history

References

1968 albums
Jeannie Seely albums
Albums produced by Fred Foster
Monument Records albums